Dance of the Polar Bears is a 1990 Danish drama film directed by Birger Larsen. The film was selected as the Danish entry for the Best Foreign Language Film at the 63rd Academy Awards, but was not accepted as a nominee.

Cast 
  as Lasse
 Tommy Kenter as father
 Birthe Neumann as mother
 Paul Hüttel as Hilding
 Laura Drasbæk as Lollo
 Hakim Bellmann Jacobsen as Gubbi
 Kristine Horn as Tina
  as teacher

See also 
 List of submissions to the 63rd Academy Awards for Best Foreign Language Film
 List of Danish submissions for the Academy Award for Best Foreign Language Film

References

External links 
 
 
 

1990 drama films
1990 films
Best Danish Film Bodil Award winners
Best Danish Film Robert Award winners
Danish drama films
1990s Danish-language films